Billboard Top Hits: 1988 is a compilation album released by Rhino Records in 1994, featuring ten hit recordings from 1988.

The 1988 volume includes nine songs that reached No. 1 on the Billboard Hot 100, while the remaining song — "Shattered Dreams" by Johnny Hates Jazz — peaked at No. 2.

Track listing

Track information and credits taken from the album's liner notes.

References

1994 compilation albums
Billboard Top Hits albums